Fibularhizoctonia is a genus of fungus in the Atheliaceae family.  The genus, circumscribed in 1996, contains three widespread species that are anamorphs of Athelia. One species of Fibularhizoctonia is commonly known as the cuckoo fungus because it makes sclerotia, also called termite balls, which mimic termite eggs. The name Athelia termitophila sp. nov. has been proposed for the teleomorph of termite balls. The generic name had been incorrectly modified to "Fibulorhizoctonia" in some publications but this change is not a nomenclaturally supportable spelling correction. The genome sequences of two species of Fibularhizoctonia have been described.

References

External links

Atheliales
Mimicry
Atheliales genera